La Vendedora de fantasías (The Fantasy Saleswoman) is a 1950 Argentine crime comedy film directed by Daniel Tinayre. It stars Mirtha Legrand and Alberto Closas.

Plot
Marta (Legrand), a department store clerk, aids her police detective fiancé (Closas) in hunting down a gang of jewel thieves. She awakens to later realise that it was all a dream.

Cast

 Mirtha Legrand as Martha
 Alberto Closas as Roberto / Aníbal Ferro, "Pulguita"
 Alberto Bello as Jaime
 Homero Cárpena as Lavanca / policeman
 Nathán Pinzón as El Cabezón
 Beba Bidart as Olga Bernard
 Francisco Charmiello as Pancho
 Diana de Córdoba as Woman in hotel
 Pilar Gómez as Catalina / mother of Alberto
 Haydée Larroca as Cholita
 Miguel Ligero as Garófalo
 Alberto Quiles as Mucamo
 Ramón J. Garay as concierge
 Alberto Barcel as chief of police
 Luis García Bosch as Borracho
 Manuel Alcón as jewelry buyer
 Carlos Belluci as Sereno
 Fernando Campos
 Carmen Llambí as telephonist
 Jesús Pampín as director of orchestra

Reception
The critic King thought it was "good cinema and another opportunity to laugh" and Noticias Gráficas considered it a "funny, agile and very well filmed police farce". Film writers Raúl Manrupe and María Alejandra Portela write: "Successful at the time, today it can be seen as an exercise of formal and conceptual arbitrariness. Valued in part by the critics, it retains some effective moments."

References

External links
 

1950 films
1950s Spanish-language films
Argentine black-and-white films
Films set in Buenos Aires
Films shot in Buenos Aires
Films directed by Daniel Tinayre
1950s crime comedy-drama films
Argentine crime comedy-drama films
1950s Argentine films